Seema Ghazal (born 17 February 1964) is a Pakistani story writer, poet, novelist, and drama writer of Urdu from Lahore, Punjab, Pakistan. Seema is best known for writing TV shows and series such as Dil-e-Jaanam, Aashti, and Noor Bano.

Filmography

Television

References 
 Seema Ghazal Writer - Biography & Dramas List on Dramas Planet
 Writer Seema Ghazal asks for government's assistance for treatment on BOL News
 TV drama writer Seema Ghazal hospitalised - 24 News HD
 Feroza makes her debut as lead character with drama serial ‘Dard Rukta Nahi’ - Daily Times
 Drama is reflection of society: Talat Hussain - The News International

External links

 Seema Ghazal on Rekhta
 Seema Ghazal on Skiddle

Living people
1964 births